Evan Dale Abel (born 1963) is an American endocrinologist who serves as Chair of the Department of Medicine at the David Geffen School of Medicine at UCLA. His works on the molecular mechanisms that underpin cardiac failure in diabetes. He is a Fellow of the American Heart Association and the American College of Physicians. He was elected a member of the National Academy of Sciences in 2022.

Early life and education 
Abel is from Jamaica, where he attended Wolmer's High School for Boys.  He was encouraged by his parents to become a doctor, lawyer or engineer. He completed his undergraduate studies at the University of the West Indies, where he specialised in medicine.  He  completed his doctoral research in physiology at the University of Oxford. He was a medical intern in surgery and paediatrics at the University of the West Indies, before completing his residency in internal medicine at Northwestern University.

Research and career 
Abel started a clinical research fellowship in diabetes at Harvard Medical School in 1992. He then  joined the faculty at Harvard, where he was appointed co-Director of the fellowship programme at Beth Israel Deaconess Medical Center. He worked alongside Barbara Kahn, with whom who identified the relationship between adipose tissue glucose transporter (GLUT4) and insulin resistance. He was recruited to the faculty at the University of Utah in 2000, first as Assistant Professor and eventually as Professor of Medicine.   Abel was supported by the National Institutes of Health to develop a mouse model of diabetes. He studied how glucose is delivered to cells. He made use of conditional gene targeting to induce genetic defects that resulted in heart muscle cells being incapable of taking up glucose.

In 2013 Abel moved to the University of Iowa as Chair of the Department of Internal Medicine. His works on the molecular mechanisms that underpin cardiac failure in diabetes. He has investigated how diabetes impacts the formation of blood clots; with the increased glucose uptake of platelets in diabetic mice promoting overactivation and excess clotting.

In 2022 Abel moved to the University of California, Los Angeles as Chair of the Department of Medicine in the David Geffen School of Medicine at UCLA.

Awards and honors 
 1986 Rhodes Scholarship at the University of Oxford
 1996 Harvard Medical School Eleanor and Miles Shore, 50th Anniversary Scholars in Medicine Fellowship
 1999 Harvard Medical School Excellence in Teaching Award
 2001 American Thyroid Association Van Meter Award
 2001 David W. Haack Memorial Award in Cardiovascular Research 
 2003 Established Investigator of the American Heart Association
 2012 Meharry Medical College James Pulliam Memorial Lectureship
 2012 Endocrine Society Gerald D. Aurbach Award Lecture
 2013 Elected Fellow of the American Heart Association
 2015 University of Tennessee Health Science Center the Max Miller Lecture 
2015 Elected to the National Academy of Medicine
 2018 NIH Director's Astute Clinician Lecture
 2018 African American Museum of Iowa History Makers Award
 2020 Selected as President-Elect of the Association of Professors of Medicine
 2020 Named by Cell Press as one of the most inspirational Black scientists in the United States.

Selected publications

References 

1963 births
Living people
21st-century African-American scientists
21st-century African-American physicians
21st-century American physicians
University of Iowa faculty
University of Utah faculty
Harvard Medical School alumni
20th-century African-American scientists
American endocrinologists
Members of the United States National Academy of Sciences
Members of the National Academy of Medicine